Meesal  is a village in the Mudukulathur taluk of Ramanathapuram district of Tamil Nadu, India.

It is the location of the grave of Umar Khattab Shaheed, who came along with Badhusha Sulthan Syed Ibrahim Shaheed of Erwadi to spread Islam in India.. The village is famous for the grave of Umar Khattab who was a commander in the army of Sultan Sikandar Badusha of Thiruparankundram, Madurai.

The village has a Primary & Middle school, Primary Health Center, Post Office, well maintained pond, Masjid Taqwa  Meesal, Kannan Temple, Ganesa Temple, Ayyanar Temple and Amman Temple, night hotel and Grocery store. This Village host annual community gathering which is well attended by all the Community leaders and members and also promote multicultural harmony;

This village is home for famous Tamil poet Vanna kalanjiyam Puluvar who contributed to Tamil literature.

Transportation
The village is connected through roads to district headquarters Ramanathapuram and nearest city Paramakudi.

Health
It has Syed Fatima Health Care centre for the medical needs of the community.

Villages in Ramanathapuram district
Sufi shrines in India
Ziyarat
Dargahs in Tamil Nadu
Erwadi-related dargahs